The Mozart Medal or Mozart-Medaille der Stadt Frankfurt is an award administered by the city of Frankfurt, named after Wolfgang Amadeus Mozart.

Recipients
 Elisabeth Schwarzkopf received this award in 1982
 Mauricio Kagel, 1983
 Junge Deutsche Philharmonie, 1984

See also
 Mozart Medal (disambiguation)

References

German music awards
Wolfgang Amadeus Mozart